The Coast Daylight, originally known as the Daylight Limited, was a passenger train on the Southern Pacific Railroad (SP) between Los Angeles and San Francisco, California, via SP's Coast Line. It was advertised as the "most beautiful passenger train in the world," carrying a particular red, orange, and black color scheme. The train operated from 1937 until 1974, one of the few passenger trains retained by Amtrak in 1971. Amtrak merged it with the Coast Starlight in 1974.

History

Southern Pacific

Southern Pacific introduced the Daylight Limited on April 28, 1922. The train operated on a 13-hour schedule between the Third and Townsend Depot in San Francisco and Central Station in Los Angeles, running on Fridays and Saturdays only. In 1922 and 1923, the train ran seasonally, beginning in April and ending in November. Daily operation began in July 1923. The SP shortened the running time to 12 hours for the 1924 season. Until the late 1920s, it made no intermediate stops (except for servicing). Its 12-hour schedule was two hours shorter than any other train on its route.

The streamlined Daylight began on March 21, 1937, pulled by GS-2 steam locomotives on a -hour schedule. It was the first of the Daylight series that later included the San Joaquin Daylight, Shasta Daylight, Sacramento Daylight, and Sunbeam. Coach fare San Francisco to Los Angeles was $9.47 one way; in 1938 it dropped to $6 to match Santa Fe's Golden Gates.

The Coast Daylight ran behind steam until January 7, 1955, long after most streamliners had changed to diesel.

A second train, the Noon Daylight, ran the same route 1940–42 and 1946–49 with a suspension during World War II. The original Coast Daylight became the Morning Daylight during this time.

In 1949 the Noon Daylight was replaced by the overnight Starlight using the same equipment. In 1956 coaches from the Starlight were added to the all-Pullman Lark and the Starlight was discontinued in 1957. Amtrak later revived the name for its Los Angeles to Seattle service known as the Coast Starlight.

A 1966 study by the Stanford Research Institute found that it cost the Southern Pacific $18.41 to transport a passenger on the Coast Daylight between Los Angeles and San Francisco, roughly twice that of air or bus service . Reasons given included the labor-intensiveness of rail service, and the fact that a single consist could make only one trip per day.

Amtrak

Amtrak took over intercity passenger service in the United States on May 1, 1971. The Coast Daylight was retained as an unnamed train, with its northern terminus changed to Oakland, California where it connected with the California Zephyr. Three days per week, it was extended to a San Diego–Seattle train. On November 14, Amtrak extended the Oakland–Los Angeles train to San Diego, renumbered it to #12/13, and renamed it Coast Daylight. The Seattle–San Diego train became the Coast Daylight/Starlight (#11-12) northbound and Coast Starlight/Daylight (#13-14) southbound. Both trains were cut back from San Diego to Los Angeles in April 1972, replaced by a third San Diegan. On June 10, 1973, Amtrak began running the combined Coast Daylight/Starlight daily for the summer months. Positive response led to Amtrak to retain this service, and the Coast Daylight name was dropped on May 19, 1974.

Proposed restoration
Amtrak has worked on plans for resuming Coast Daylight service from San Francisco to Los Angeles since the early 1990s. It may be merged with the existing Pacific Surfliner route, thus extending the line to San Diego. More specific plans have been made in the last few years. The latest review of the possibility of service restoration was made on August 14, 2014, the San Luis Obispo Council of Governments (SLOCOG) organized and hosted a meeting between the Los Angeles – San Diego – San Luis Obispo (LOSSAN) Rail Corridor Agency and the Coast Rail Coordinating Council (CRCC), where substantial progress was made toward identifying which specific policy initiatives would be given priority so that restoration of the Coast Daylight service might be effectuated before the end of the decade. A plan by Chicago-based Corridor Capital would involve the use of ex-Santa Fe Hi-Level cars and EMD F59PHI locomotives in a top-and-tail formation.

In 2021, shortly after president Joe Biden entered office, Amtrak released a plan for route restructuring which specifically targeted new corridor service, and the Coast Daylight was listed as one of the routes desired for restoration.

Equipment

The heavyweight Daylight Limited debuted in 1922 with five 72-seat coaches and a dining car. American Car and Foundry delivered new 90-seat coaches in 1923; the Southern Pacific also added a 32-seat parlor-observation car. 4-6-2 "Pacific" steam locomotives hauled the train up and down the coast. 4-8-2 "Mountain" locomotives displaced the Pacifics in the early 1930s. The Southern Pacific removed the observation cars in 1931.

Pullman-Standard delivered two complete sets of equipment (consists) for the 1937 Coast Daylight. Each consisted of a 44-seat baggage-coach; a 48-seat coach; three pairs of articulated coaches, with 50 seats in each of the six coaches; a lunch counter-tavern car, a dining car, a 29-seat parlor car; and a 23-seat parlor-observation car. Each consist cost $1 million (equivalent to $ in  adjusted for inflation), the most expensive passenger trains built in the United States to date.

In the articulated coaches restrooms were split, with the men's restroom in the odd-numbered car and the women's restroom in the even-numbered car. Seating was 2×2, with a center aisle down the middle. Luggage storage was located adjacent to the vestibule. The coffee shop-tavern had two seating areas. At one end of the car was the coffee shop, with 24 individual stools arrayed around a counter. At the other end was the tavern, with booth seating for 18. Between the two areas was a kitchen. The dining car could seat 40 patrons at 10 tables. The parlor-observation car seated 10 in the rear, rounded-off observation area and a further 23 in the adjoining parlor section.

Prior to the full reequipping in 1940 the Southern Pacific made several changes to augment capacity. In 1938 it replaced the coffee shop-tavern cars with individual tavern and coffee shop cars. The original cars were rebuilt as full taverns and assigned to the Los Angeles–New Orleans Argonaut. The following year the Southern Pacific swapped the individual 48-seat coaches with an additional articulated coach pair from the Houston–Dallas Sunbeam.

The 1937–1939 equipment ran as the Noon Daylight with the inauguration of the Morning Daylight in 1940. For the Morning Daylight, the Southern Pacific ordered two new sets of equipment from Pullman-Standard. These included a 44-seat coach-baggage car; three pairs of articulated coaches, with 46 seats in each of the six coaches; a triple-unit coffee shop-kitchen-dining car; a 44-seat coach; a tavern car; a 27-seat parlor car; and a 22-seat parlor-observation car.

The Morning Daylight would be completely reequipped just a year later. The 1940 baggage-coach, tavern, and parlor were retained. It was assigned new articulated coach pairs (with the number increased from three to four), triple-unit coffee shop-kitchen-dining car, 44-seat coach, and parlor-observation car. Effectively it was the same train as in 1940, but a year newer, with an additional articulated coach. The Noon Daylight mixed old and new equipment:

 the baggage-coaches from the 1937 train
 the articulated coaches from the 1940 Morning Daylight
 the triple-unit coffee shop-kitchen-dining cars from the 1940 Morning Daylight
 a new articulated coach pair, seating 46 like all the others
 the 44-seat coach from the 1940 Morning Daylight
 the parlor car from the 1937 train
 the parlor-observation car from the 1940 Morning Daylight

With the discontinuance of the Noon Daylight in 1949 its cars were reassigned to the San Joaquin Daylight and Starlight. The Coast Daylight gained new 48-seat coaches from Pullman-Standard in 1954, three per train.

Dining cars were eliminated in the 1960s, replaced by Automat cars that offered food from vending machines instead of made-to-order meals in the dining cars, cutting the cost of the train's dining crew.

Locomotives
Two Coast Daylight locomotives survive: Southern Pacific 4449, a GS-4 steam locomotive which was a Bicentennial American Freedom Train engine in 1975–76, and Southern Pacific 6051, an EMD E9 diesel locomotive.

 Steam Locomotives

 Diesel Locomotives

See also
 Passenger train service on the Southern Pacific Railroad

Notes

References

Further reading

External links

 Friends of SP 4449
 1938 timetable

Passenger trains of the Southern Pacific Transportation Company
Named passenger trains of the United States
Railway services introduced in 1922
Articulated passenger trains
Railway services discontinued in 1974
Former Amtrak routes
Proposed Amtrak routes